Willtown Bluff, also known as Wilton and New London, is a historic settlement site located on the S. Edisto River near Adams Run, Charleston County, South Carolina. Founded about 1704, it was the second planned town to be established after the relocation of Charleston in 1682. Willtown served as a local governmental center (polling place, court of pleas, magistrate court) and regional commercial center. The property includes three early-19th century buildings: the Parsonage (c. 1836), the Willtown Plantation House (c. 1820), and the remains of a single column of the Episcopal church (c. 1836). Unexposed remains are of a colonial village thought to have had 80 houses.

It was listed on the National Register of Historic Places in 1974.

References

Planned communities in the United States
Archaeological sites on the National Register of Historic Places in South Carolina
National Register of Historic Places in South Carolina
Populated places on the National Register of Historic Places
Buildings and structures completed in 1836
Buildings and structures in Charleston County, South Carolina
National Register of Historic Places in Charleston County, South Carolina